St Martin le Grand, York is a Grade II* listed parish church in the Church of England in York.

History

The church dates from the 11th century. The tower was built in the 15th century.

It was restored between 1853 and 1854  by JB and W Atkinson of York. The south side and eastern ends of the aisles were rebuilt, and the pierced battlement was added, to replace one removed 40 years earlier. The porch was added at the east end into Coney Street, and a south porch also added near the tower. New stained glass windows by William Wailes were added.

The clock on the east front was added in 1856 by Mr Cooke, with a carved figure of the ‘Little Admiral’ dating from 1778.

It was badly damaged by bombing on 29 April 1942 and was rebuilt between 1961 and 1968 under the supervision of George Pace. The reredos screen was designed by Frank Roper.

Stained glass
The church is noted as having a large medieval window with scenes from the life of St Martin.  Luckily this was removed for safe keeping in 1940, and was not destroyed in the bombing of April 1942.

Parish status
The church is in a joint parish with St Helen's Church, Stonegate, York.

Memorials
Robert Horsfield (d. 1711)
Thomas Colthurst (d. 1588)
Lady Elizabeth Sheffield (d. 1633)
John Kendall (d. 1823) and his wife (d. 1833)
Valentine Nalson (d. 1722/3)

Organ

The pipe organ was built by J. W. Walker & Sons Ltd and dates from 1968. It was the gift of the West German government and the Evangelical Church. A specification of the organ can be found on the National Pipe Organ Register.

References

Martin Le Grand
Martin
Buildings and structures in the United Kingdom destroyed during World War II
York
St Martin